"Ringo no ki ni Kakurenbo" was written by C.W. Nicol and Mariko Nicol in 1979. It won the Yamaha Popular Song Contest at the Tsumagoi Exhibition Hall, on May 6, 1979. It is on the album Sail Down the River where it is listed as being 3 minutes and 49 seconds long.

1979 songs